Erich Kestin (25 June 1895 – 22 May 1969) was a German actor. He appeared in more than 50 films shows between 1930 and 1953.

Selected filmography

 Dolly Gets Ahead (1930)
 The Tiger Murder Case (1930)
 The Stolen Face (1930)
 Love's Carnival (1930)
 The Blonde Nightingale (1930)
 A Student's Song of Heidelberg (1930)
 Her Grace Commands (1931)
 The Paw (1931)
 Ash Wednesday (1931)
 The Leap into the Void (1932)
 The Cheeky Devil (1932)
 Modern Dowry (1932)
 The Blue of Heaven (1932)
 The Importance of Being Earnest (1932)
 The Testament of Cornelius Gulden (1932)
 No Day Without You (1933)
 Two Good Comrades (1933)
 The Castle in the South (1933)
 Every Day Isn't Sunday (1935)
 Trouble Backstairs (1935)
 Maria the Maid (1936)
 Lucky Kids (1936)
 Paul and Pauline (1936)
 Gasparone (1937)
 Woman's Love—Woman's Suffering (1937)
 Marionette (1939)
 Josef the Chaste (1953)

References

External links

1895 births
1969 deaths
German male film actors
20th-century German male actors
Male actors from Berlin